Željko Krajan (born 3 February 1979) is a Croatian tennis coach and former professional player.

Playing career
Krajan, a native of Varaždin, began playing tennis at age six. His greatest success as a junior player was winning the Orange Bowl doubles tournament with Ivan Ljubičić in 1995.

Krajan started his pro career at the ATP Tour in 1997. His highest ATP ranking was No. 88 in August 2002. In 2003 Krajan was sidelined following a shoulder surgery. In 2004 he suffered a serious quadriceps tear, which ultimately caused his retirement from professional tennis in 2005.

Coaching career
From 2005 on, Krajan turned to coaching, at first working with Saša Tuksar, a young Croatian tennis player, and then with German junior players as Heinz Günthardt's assistant coach. In 2006 and 2007 he played in the German Regionalliga Süd-Ost for TC Ismaning. In October 2007, upon recommendation by Ivan Ljubičić, he became the coach of Dinara Safina, who was at the time at a psychological low point of her career, ranked No. 17 in the world, and close to retiring from tennis. Under Krajan's lead, Safina scored good results in the early 2008 season and placed runner-up in the 2008 French Open. After the 2008 French Open, Krajan was joined by Dejan Vojnović, retired Croatian Olympic sprinter, who became Safina's fitness coach. Her continued string of good results earned her the 2008 WTA Most Improved Player award, and the World No. 1 spot in April 2009. Safina described Krajan as "totally different from any other tennis coach" due to his patience and positive approach, as opposed to being preoccupied with correcting flaws in one's game.

Safina and Krajan parted ways in May 2010. In June of the same year Krajan started coaching Dominika Cibulková. Krajan ceased working with Cibulkova in April 2012. In January 2012 Krajan took over coaching of the Croatian Davis Cup team. From April to June 2012 Krajan worked with Jelena Janković on trial basis. In August 2012 Krajan began coaching Laura Robson, until they parted ways in May 2013, before the Mutua Madrid Open.

Since May 2013, he returned to work in the ATP, coaching Former World No. 8 and Australian Open finalist Marcos Baghdatis.

In November 2014, Borna Ćorić decided to take Krajan as his new coach.

In April 2015, he left Ćorić and has quit being his coach to spend more time with his family.

On 25 November 2018, he won the Davis Cup with the national team.

On 9 November 2019, just nine days before the Davis Cup, he parted ways with the national team.

ATP Challenger and ITF Futures finals

Singles: 9 (6–3)

Doubles: 4 (2–2)

References

External links
 
 
 

1979 births
Croatian male tennis players
Croatian tennis coaches
People from Varaždin
Living people